Iolaus mermis is a butterfly in the family Lycaenidae first described by Hamilton Herbert Druce in 1896. It is found in Kenya (from the coast to Meru) and Tanzania (from the northern coast to Amani). The habitat consists of forests.

The larvae feed on Helixanthera verruculosa, Oncella ambigua, Agelanthus sansibarensis and Agelanthus subulatus.

References

External links

Die Gross-Schmetterlinge der Erde 13: Die Afrikanischen Tagfalter. Plate XIII 68 e

Butterflies described in 1896
Iolaus (butterfly)
Butterflies of Africa
Taxa named by Hamilton Herbert Druce